Catullus 42 is a Latin poem of twenty-four lines in Phalaecean metre by the Roman poet Catullus.

Text

Analysis 
E. T. Merrill describes the female figure of the poem as "an unknown woman, apparently a courtezan with whom Catullus has quarrelled, [who] refuses to return to him his tablets, and hence these verses are marshalled to enforce the demand." He believes the woman was "certainly not Lesbia, for on no occasion does Catullus speak of her or to her in a tone of careless brutality, without any trace of former regard." Some critics, especially comparing verse 5 with Catullus 43.3 and Catullus 43.6, have thought her to be Ameana, but the position of Catullus 42 between two others concerning her is perhaps an indication that such was not the opinion of the original editor of the liber Catulli.

References

Sources 
 Burton, Richard F.; Smithers, Leonard C., eds. (1894). The Carmina of Caius Valerius Catullus. London: Printed for the Translators: for Private Subscribers. pp. 77–78.
 Merrill, Elmer Truesdell, ed. (1893). Catullus (College Series of Latin Authors). Boston, MA: Ginn and Company. pp. 73–74.

External links 

 C. Valerius Catullus. "Catul. 42". Carmina. Leonard C. Smithers, ed. Perseus Digital Library. Retrieved 27 February 2023.

C042
Articles containing video clips

Love poems